Frédéric Chevalme (born 14 January 1974) is a retired French professional footballer who played as a forward.

Chevalme played for OFC Charleville during the 1996–97 Ligue 2 season.

References

External links

Frédéric Chevalme career information at sco1919.fr

1974 births
Living people
Sportspeople from Montbéliard
French footballers
Association football forwards
FC Annecy players
Dijon FCO players
Angers SCO players
Racing Besançon players
Thouars Foot 79 players
Gap HAFC players
JS Saint-Pierroise players
Tours FC players
Thonon Evian Grand Genève F.C. players
Ligue 2 players
OFC Charleville players
Footballers from Bourgogne-Franche-Comté